Frenkendorf-Füllinsdorf railway station is a railway station in the municipality of Frenkendorf, in the Swiss canton of Basel-Landschaft. It is an intermediate stop on the standard gauge Hauenstein line of Swiss Federal Railways. The station is located in Frenkendorf, across the Ergolz river from Füllinsdorf.

Services 
 the following services stop at Frenkendorf-Füllinsdorf:

 Basel trinational S-Bahn: : half-hourly service between Laufen and Olten, with every other train continuing from Laufen to Porrentruy.

References

External links 
 
 

Railway stations in Basel-Landschaft
Swiss Federal Railways stations